{{DISPLAYTITLE:C19H28N2O4}}
The molecular formula C19H28N2O4 may refer to:

 Carpindolol, a beta blocker
 Roxatidine acetate, a histamine H2 receptor antagonist drug

Molecular formulas